According to the psychoanalytic explanation of psychosomatic illness, organ language is the bodily expression of an unconscious conflict as a form of symbolic communication. It is also called organ-speech, a term that Sigmund Freud uses in his 1915 essay "The Unconscious" attributing its coinage to Victor Tausk.

History
In 1915 Freud wrote:

Definition
According to the American Psychiatric Association,

In other words, the target organ, tissue or somatic function would be semantically related to the repressed mental content.

Cause
Authors such as Jurgen Ruesch believe these disorders represent an infantile use of body language by individuals who are unable to express themselves effectively by verbal means.

Further examples
"Difficulty in swallowing may represent an unpalatable situation; an asthmatic episode may symbolize a load on the chest; itching may simbolize irritation or that 'something has gotten under the person's skin'." "A chronically uncontrollable contraction of the hand into a clenched fist [...] may symbolize hostility as much as angry words do. Hysterical seizures may, in a distorted fashion, express sexuality or tantrum-like hostility and anger. [...] Blurred vision and functional blindness have been interpreted in various cases as an expression of guilt consequent on real or fancied misdeeds, a fear of the outer world and a magical attempt to do away with it, or a reaction-formation to the unconscious wish to be a voyeur. A hand paralysis may symbolize masturbation guilt or a struggle to inhibit hostility." "Difficulty in swallowing food has been interpreted by analysts as evidence of something 'unpalatable' in the person's life situation; nausea is inability to 'stomach' something unpleasant; vomiting is rejection; asthmatic difficulties symbolize the existence of a load on one's chest; pain in the shoulder or arm indicates an inhibited impulse to strike out aggressively; and neurodermatitic itching is a somatic expression of the saying, 'He gets under my skin'."

Divergences with the psychiatric paradigm

Psychiatry not influenced by such psychoanalytic ideas rejects both the semantic correlation with the target organ and that the cause is an unconscious conflict. If anything, psychosomatizations are due to stress affecting a "constitutional" target organ, correlated by hereditary factors.

See also
Conversion disorder
Somatization disorder

References

Further reading
 
 

Freudian psychology
Mind–body interventions
Psychodynamics
Psychoanalytic terminology
Psychoanalytic theory
Somatic psychology